Chased Into Love is a lost 1917 American silent short comedy film directed by and starring Charles Parrot (alias Charley Chase) along with Hank Mann and Carmen Phillips. It was produced and distributed by Fox Film Corporation.

Cast
Hank Mann as The Bridegroom-to-Be
Carmen Phillips as The Bride-to-Be
John Lancaster as Her Father
Joe Lee as The Lover
Charles Arling as The Lawyer
Charley Chase -

References

External links

Lobby poster (HeritageAuctions, ha)

1917 short films
American silent short films
American black-and-white films
Films directed by Charley Chase
Fox Film films
Lost American films
Silent American comedy films
1917 comedy films
1917 films
1917 lost films
Lost comedy films
1910s American films